Svenskt biografiskt lexikon is a Swedish biographical dictionary, started in 1917. The first volume, covering names Abelin to Anjou, was published in 1918. As of 2017, names from A to S are covered.

Volumes 
 ABELIN – ANJOU (1918)
 ANKARCRONA – BECKER (1920)
 BECK – FRIIS – BERNDES (1922)
 BERNDES – BLOCK (1924)
 BLOM – BRANNIUS (1925)
 BRANT – BYGDÉN (1926)
 BÜLOW – CEDERGREN (1927)
 CEDERHIELM – CORNELIUS (1929)
 CORNELL – DAL (1931)
 DíALBEDYHLL – DE LA GARDIE (1931)
 DE LA GRANGE – EBERSKÖLD (1945)
 EBERSTEIN – EKMAN (1949)
 EKMAN – ENWALL (1950)
 ENVALLSSON – FAHLBECK (1953)
 FAHLBERG – FEUK (1956)
 FICH – GEHLIN (1964–1966)
 GEIJER – HALL (1967–1969)
 HALLARDT – HEURGREN (1969–1971)
 HEURLIN – INGE (1971–1973)
 INGEBORG – KATARINA (1973–75)
 KATARINA – KÖNIGSMARCK (1975–77)
 KÖNIGSMARCK – LILJA (1977–79)
 LILJEBLAD – LJUNGBERGER (1980–1981)
 LJUNGDAHL – MALMROS (1982–1984)
 MALMROS-MUNCK AF ROSENSCHÖLD (1985–1987)
 MUNCK AF ROSENSCHÖLD – NILSSON (1987–1989)
 NILSSON – NÄSSTRÖM (1990–1991)
 ODEBERG – PEDERBY (1992–1994)
 PEGELOW – RETTIG (1995–1997)
 RETZIUS-RYD (1998–2000)
 RYDBECK-SEGERSTEDT (2000–2002)
 SEHLSTEDT-SPARRE (2003–2006)
 STILLE-STRANDELL (2010)

See also
Svenskt biografiskt handlexikon

References

External links
 Svenskt biografiskt lexikon

1917 non-fiction books
Swedish biographical dictionaries